Egil Johansen may refer to:

 Egil Johansen (musician) (1934–1998), Norwegian-Swedish jazz drummer
 Egil Johansen (footballer) (born 1962), Norwegian footballer
 Egil Johansen (orienteer) (born 1954), Norwegian orienteer
 Egil Borgen Johansen (1934–1993), Norwegian archer

See also
 Tor Egil Johansen (born 1950), Norwegian footballer